
Szamotuły County is a unit of territorial administration and local government (powiat) in Greater Poland Voivodeship, west-central Poland. It came into existence on January 1, 1999, as a result of the Polish local government reforms passed in 1998.

As of 2006 its total population is 85,849, out of which the population of Szamotuły is 18,760, that of Wronki is 11,551, that of Pniewy is 7,464, that of Obrzycko is 2,170, that of Ostroróg is 1,995, and the rural population is 43,909.

Neighbouring counties
Szamotuły County is bordered by Czarnków-Trzcianka County to the north, Oborniki County to the east, Poznań County to the south-east, Nowy Tomyśl County to the south-west and Międzychód County to the west.

Administrative division
The county is subdivided into eight gminas (one urban, four urban-rural and three rural). These are listed in the following table, in descending order of population.

References
Polish official population figures 2006

 
Land counties of Greater Poland Voivodeship